Rabidosa is a genus of spiders described by Roewer (1960). The family is Lycosidae. It contains the following species:

Rabidosa carrana (Bryant, 1934) — USA
Rabidosa hentzi (Banks, 1904) — USA
Rabidosa punctulata (Hentz, 1844) — USA
Rabidosa rabida (Walckenaer, 1837) — North America
Rabidosa santrita (Chamberlin & Ivie, 1942) — USA

References

Lycosidae
Spiders of North America
Araneomorphae genera
Taxa named by Carl Friedrich Roewer